Griffithsia elegans is a species of red algae in the family Wrangeliaceae. It is found in Australia and New Zealand. The type locality is Robe, South Australia.

References

External links 
 

 Griffithsia elegans at AlgaeBase

Species described in 1976
Ceramiales